Hongkongnalli Agent Amar is a 1989 Indian Kannada film,  directed by  Joe Simon and produced by Santhosh Shindhe, G. Madangopal, S. Chakrapani and Peter J. Kamilose. The film stars Ambareesh and Ambika. The film has musical score by Peter J. Kamilose. This is Ambareesh's 100th movie.

Cast

Ambareesh
Ambika
K. S. Ashwath
Vajramuni
Mukhyamantri Chandru
Thoogudeepa Srinivas
Sudheer
Rajanand
Umashree
Anuradha
Bob Christo
Rockline Venkatesh
Sumalatha in a special appearance
Jai Jagadish in a special appearance
Vijayalakshmi Singh in a special appearance

Soundtrack

References

1989 films
1980s Kannada-language films
Films set in Hong Kong